Alfred "Alf" Peter Penketh (1865 - 18 February 1932) was a Manx rugby union player, who took part in the first 1888 British Isles tour to New Zealand and Australia. He played for Douglas Rugby Football Club.

Personal history
Penketh was born in 1865 to Richard Penketh and his birth was registered on the Isle of Man. He married Frances Laura Jane Holmes on 1 June 1910.

Rugby career
Penketh was a forward, and played in 19 games of the tour, scoring a solitary try, against Canterbury in New Zealand on 9 May 1888.

Other than the British Isles tour, he was not selected for any national side (the Isle of Man itself has never fielded a national team). He was the only Manxman to have been selected for the British Lions.

See also
 Rugby union in the Isle of Man

References

1865 births
1932 deaths
Manx rugby union players
Manx people
British & Irish Lions rugby union players from the Isle of Man
Rugby union forwards